This article is about the particular significance of the decade 1850–1859 to Wales and its people.

Incumbents
Prince of Wales – Albert Edward
Princess of Wales – vacant

Events
1850
1851
1852
1853
1854
1855
1856
1857
1858
1859

Arts and literature

Awards
National Eisteddfod of Wales 
1853 — "Islwyn" wins the crown at the Abergavenny eisteddfod.
1858 — "Great Eisteddfod" at Llangollen; early appearance of Gorsedd ceremony.

New books
Anne Beale — Gladys of Harlech (1858)
John Blackwell (Alun) — Ceinion Alun (1851;posthumously published)
B. B. Davies — The History of Wales (1853)
Samuel Evans (Gomerydd) — Y Gomerydd (1854)
John Ceiriog Hughes — Gohebiaethau Syr Meurig Crynswth (vol. 1) (1856)
Aneurin Jones — Tafol y Beirdd(1852)
John Jones (Talhaiarn) — Gwaith Talhaiarn, vol. 1 (1855)
Owen Wynne Jones
Fy Oriau Hamddenol (1854)
Dafydd Llwyd (1857)
Lleucu Llwyd (1858)
Robert Parry (Robyn Ddu Eryri) — Teithiau a Barddoniaeth Robyn Ddu Eryri (1857)
William Rees (Gwilym Hiraethog)
Aelwyd F'Ewythr Robert (1852)
Gweithiau Barddonol Gwilym Hiraethog (1855)
William Thomas (Islwyn) — Barddoniaeth (1854)
William Thomas (Gwilym Marles) — Prydyddiaeth (1859)
Morris Williams (Nicander) — Y Psalmwyr (1850)
William Williams (Creuddynfab) — Y Barddoniadur (1855)

Music
Y Blwch Cerddorol (collection of hymns and anthems) (1854)
Thomas Jones (Gogrynwr) — Gweddi Habacuc (cantata) (1851)
J. Ambrose Lloyd — Teyrnasoedd y Ddaear (1852)
Edward Stephen (Tanymarian) — Ystorm Tiberias (oratorio) (1852)
January 1856 — The Welsh national anthem, Hen Wlad Fy Nhadau, is composed by James James with lyrics by his father Evan James.

Births
1850
4 January — Griffith J. Griffith, industrialist (died 1919)
16 April — Sidney Gilchrist Thomas, inventor (died 1885)
1851
24 March — Robert Ambrose Jones (Emrys ap Iwan) (d. 1906)
8 July — Sir Arthur Evans, archaeologist (d. 1941)
27 December — Percy Gilchrist, industrialist
date unknown — Elizabeth Phillips Hughes, promoter of women's education (died 1925)
1852
20 March — John Gwenogvryn Evans, palaeographer (died 1930)
26 April — William Eilir Evans, journalist (died 1910)
28 April — Sir Francis Edwards, 1st Baronet, Liberal politician (died 1927)
11 May — Sir David Saunders Davies, MP (died 1934)
25 November — Sir Evan Vincent Evans, Eisteddfod supporter (died 1934)
December — Alice Gray Jones (Ceridwen Peris), writer (died 1943)
1855
date unknown — Jeremiah Jones, poet (died 1902)
1856
26 March — David Alfred Thomas, politician (died 1918)
1858
28 January — Edgeworth David, explorer (died 1934)
28 December — Josiah Towyn Jones, politician
1859
16 February — T. E. Ellis, politician (died 1899)
17 July — Ernest Rhys, writer (died 1946)

Deaths
1850
2 September — Charles Williams-Wynn, politician (born 1775)
1851
6 April — William Morgan Kinsey, travel writer (born 1788)
30 June — Thomas Phillips, founder of Llandovery College (born 1760)
1852
23 February — Evan Jones (Ieuan Gwynedd), minister and journalist, 31
2 May — John Jones (Ioan Tegid), poet (born 1792)
26 November — John Josiah Guest, engineer, entrepreneur and politician, 77
1853
date unknown — William Roberts, preacher (b. 1809)
1854
3 April — Edward Lloyd, 1st Baron Mostyn, politician (born 1768)
29 April — Henry Paget, 1st Marquess of Anglesey, soldier and politician (born 1768)
1855
28 June — FitzRoy Somerset, 1st Baron Raglan (born 1788)
date unknown
Sir John Morris, 1st Baronet, industrialist
John Henry Vivian, industrialist (born 1785)
1857
10 February — David Thompson, explorer (born to Welsh parents 1770)
12 August — William Daniel Conybeare, dean of Llandaff (born 1787)
16 August — John Jones, Talysarn, leading non-conformist minister (born 1796)
1858
17 November — Robert Owen, founder of the Co-operative Society (born 1771)
20 November — Sir Joseph Bailey, 1st Baronet, ironmaster (born 1783)
18 December — John Salusbury Piozzi Salusbury, nephew of Hester Thrale (born 1793)